Graem Whyte is an American sculptor and gallerist. White was born and raised in metropolitan Detroit and now lives in Hamtramck, Michigan.

Art career 
His career started in the field of architecture, later shifted to fine art, and now hybridizes both disciplines. His work utilizes a wide array of materials and often fuses architecture, mythology, and patterns of mathematics and nature with a wry sense of humor.

In 2007 Whyte and his wife, Faina Lerman, founded the experimental art venue Popps Packing in Hamtramck. A later part of the Popps Packing project is Popps Emporium, an experimental storefront, community gallery, and social club utilizing barter and time-based exchange. 

Whyte's Squash House project involved the conversion of an abandoned house in Detroit into a squash court and community squash garden. 

Whyte exhibited at the Cue Art foundation in 2014. His public sculpture Memory Field, a collaboration with his wife Faina Lerman, is installed in Detroit's Calimera Park.

References 

 "Instrumental"

External links 
 Official site

Artists from Detroit
Living people
College for Creative Studies
Year of birth missing (living people)
Sculptors from Michigan